Policarpo Ribeiro de Oliveira (21 December 1907 – May 1986) was a Brazilian football player. He played for the Brazil national football team at the 1930 FIFA World Cup finals.

Poly played club football for Americano.

References

1907 births
1986 deaths
Brazilian footballers
Brazil international footballers
1930 FIFA World Cup players
Association football forwards